Jorge Claudio Conceiçao Rodriguez (born 1 October 1975), or simply Jorginho, is a Brazilian football coach and a former player.

External links
 
 Jorginho at HKFA
  Profile by Citizen AA

1975 births
Footballers from São Paulo
Living people
Sport Club Corinthians Alagoano players
Brazilian footballers
Sport Club Corinthians Paulista players
Goiás Esporte Clube players
FC Arsenal Tula players
Brazilian expatriate footballers
Expatriate footballers in Russia
PFC Krylia Sovetov Samara players
Russian Premier League players
Comercial Futebol Clube (Ribeirão Preto) players
Pohang Steelers players
Expatriate footballers in South Korea
Maccabi Petah Tikva F.C. players
Expatriate footballers in Israel
Sun Hei SC players
Expatriate footballers in Hong Kong
Brazilian football managers
Brazilian expatriate football managers
Expatriate football managers in Hong Kong
Association football midfielders